Edi Mauricio Sanches Semedo (born 6 January 1999) is a Portuguese footballer who plays as a forward for Penafiel.

Club career
On 7 July 2019, Semedo signed with Belenenses SAD from Benfica. Semedo debuted for Belenenses SAD in a 2-0 Primeira Liga loss to Gil Vicente on 12 January 2020.

On 11 August 2021, he joined Penafiel.

Personal life
Born in Portugal, Semedo is of Cape Verdean descent.

References

External links

ZeroZero Profile

1999 births
Living people
Sportspeople from Funchal
Portuguese footballers
Portuguese people of Cape Verdean descent
Association football forwards
Belenenses SAD players
C.D. Mafra players
F.C. Penafiel players
Primeira Liga players
Liga Portugal 2 players
Campeonato de Portugal (league) players